= Rob Kaz =

American artist

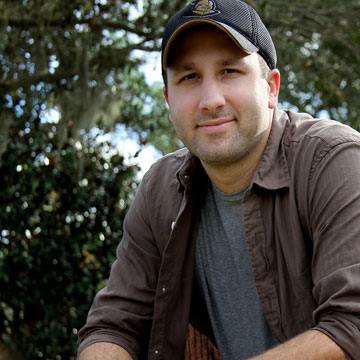
- Artist Rob Kaz
- Born: 1978 (age 47–48)
- Education: University of Central Florida
- Known for: Oil Paintings, particularly his paintings of Beau the frog, Disney and Star Wars
- Style: Whimsical, Animated
- Website: www.robkazart.com

Rob Kaz (born 1978) is an American artist known for his original oil paintings that reflect a "whimsical animated style." Based in Orlando, Florida, he did not attend art school, but studied criminal justice at the University of Central Florida and graduated in 2001. He was hired by an animation studio when he could not find a job in criminal justice. After three jobs in boutique studios, he was hired by video game company Electronic Arts. In 2008 he left EA and began to sell his own fine art pieces. He had his first show in October 2008. Kaz is licensed to paint Disney and Star Wars based paintings. Star Wars creator George Lucas purchased some of Kaz's original Star Wars paintings. His artwork was on display at a gallery in Austin, Texas which featured Muppet-themed artworks.

Kaz's work was featured at Disney's inaugural event Epcot International Festival Of The Arts at Epcot Center in Orlando, Florida.

Kaz was commissioned by the University of Central Florida, his alma mater, to paint a large 30' x 90' wave painting that would appear as a mural on the floor of the Carl Black & Gold Cabana, a beach-themed club level area of the school's football stadium located on the 30-yard line. The painting featured hidden easter eggs in the sand and the waves that related to the history of the school and the football team.

Kaz is recognized for his original character named Beauregard "Beau" who is a tiny green frog. His collection of art called "Friends Along the Way" features Beau the frog who meets many other original characters through his adventures.

Rob and his art were the subject of a video produced by Disney's Animals, Science and Environment team. Rob finds inspiration from the animals at Disney's Animal Kingdom and paints them for his collection Friends Along The Way. The collection is on display at Disney's Animal Kingdom in Florida.
